Jack McLeod (8 August 1907 – 7 August 1974) was an Australian rules footballer who played with St Kilda in the Victorian Football League (VFL).

References

External links 

1907 births
1974 deaths
Australian rules footballers from Victoria (Australia)
St Kilda Football Club players
Bairnsdale Football Club players